Bindi Hindowa Samba is a Sierra Leonean paramount chief of the Bo District, one of the four districts that make up the Southern Province.

See also
Politics of Sierra Leone

External links
https://web.archive.org/web/20071022093714/http://slpp.ws/browse.asp?page=426 

Year of birth missing (living people)
Living people
Members of the Parliament of Sierra Leone
Place of birth missing (living people)
Mende people